Lava Beds National Monument is located in northeastern California, in Siskiyou and Modoc counties. The monument lies on the northeastern flank of Medicine Lake Volcano and has the largest total area covered by a volcano in the Cascade Range.

The region in and around Lava Beds National Monument lies at the junction of the Sierra-Klamath, Cascade, and Great Basin physiographic provinces.

Lava Beds National Monument has numerous lava tubes, with 27 having marked entrances and developed trails for public access and exploration. The monument also offers trails through the high Great Basin xeric shrubland desert landscape and the volcanic field. In 1872 and 1873, the area was the site of the Modoc War, involving a band led by Kintpuash (also known as Captain Jack). The area of Captain Jack's Stronghold was named in his honor.

Geologic formations
Lava Beds National Monument is geologically significant because of its wide variety of volcanic formations, including lava tubes, fumaroles, cinder cones, spatter cones,  pit craters, hornitos, maars, lava flows, and volcanic fields.

Volcanic eruptions on the Medicine Lake shield volcano have created a rugged landscape punctuated by these many landforms of volcanism.

Cones 

Cinder cones are formed when magma is under great pressure. It is released in a fountain of lava, blown into the air from a central vent. The lava cools as it falls, forming cinders that pile up around the vent. When the pressure has been relieved, the rest of the lava flows from the base of the cone. Cinder cones are typically monogenetic.

The cinder cones of Hippo Butte, Three Sisters, Juniper Butte, and Crescent Butte are all older than the Mammoth and Modoc Crater flows, more than 30,000–40,000 years old. Eagle Nest Butte and Bearpaw Butte are 114,000 years old. Schonchin Butte cinder cone and the andesitic flow from its base were formed around 62,000 years ago. The flow that formed Valentine Cave erupted 10,850 years ago. An eruption that formed The Castles is younger than the Mammoth Crater flows. Even younger were eruptions from Fleener Chimneys, such as the Devil's Homestead flow, 10,500 years ago, and Black Crater 3,025 years ago. About 1,110 years ago, plus or minus 60 years, the Callahan flow was produced by an eruption from Cinder Butte. Though Cinder Butte is just outside the boundary of the monument, the Callahan flow is in Lava Beds and is the youngest flow in the monument.

Spatter cones are built out of thicker lava. The lava is thrown out of the vent and builds, layer by layer, a chimney surrounding the vent. Fleener Chimneys and Black Crater are examples of spatter cones.

Lava flows 

Roughly ninety percent of the lava in the Lava Beds Monument is basaltic. There are primarily two kinds of basaltic lava flows: pahoehoe and ʻaʻā. Pahoehoe is smooth, often ropy and is the most common type of lava in Lava Beds. ʻAʻā is formed when pahoehoe cools and loses some of its gases. ʻAʻā is rough, sharp, and jagged; an excellent example is the Devil's Homestead lava flow, which originated at Fleener Chimneys. Most of the rest of the lava in the monument is andesitic. Pumice, a type of rhyolitic lava, also is found covering the monument; this rained down around 900 years ago during the eruption of Glass Mountain.

The flows from Mammoth and Modoc Craters comprise about two-thirds of the lava in the monument. Over 30 separate lava flows located in the park range in age from 2,000,000 years BP to 1,110 years BP. Some of the major lava flows within Lava Beds National Monument include the Callahan Flow; Schonchin Flow; Mammoth Crater Flow; Modoc Crater Flow; and Devil's Homestead Flow.

Lava fields 
Gillem Bluff, a fault scarp, was created as the region stretched and a block of earth dropped down along this fault (see Basin and Range Province). The tuff layer on top of Gillem Bluff is 2,000,000 years old, indicating the rock layers beneath are even older. The oldest lava flow from the Medicine Lake Volcano within the monument is the Basalt of Hovey Point, near Captain Jack's Stronghold, which is 450,000 years old. Petroglyph Point was created about 275,000 years ago when cinders erupted through the shallow water of Tule Lake; violent explosions of ash and steam formed layers upon layers of tuff.

The caldera is thought to have formed by subsidence, during which basalt and andesite were erupted up on the slopes.

Lava tubes 

Lava flows dated to about 30,000–40,000 years ago formed most of the lava tubes in the monument. As the hot basaltic lava flowed downhill, the top cooled and crusted over, insulating the rest of the lava and forming lava tubes. Lavacicles on the ceiling of a lava tube were produced as the level of lava in the tube retreated and the viscous lava on the ceiling dripped as it cooled.

Dripstone was created when lava splashed on the inside walls of the tubes. The leaching of minerals from pumice gravel, soils, and overlying rock provides for deposition of secondary speleothems in lava tubes.

Lava Beds National Monument has the largest concentration of lava tubes in North America. One has electrical lighting; the others are illuminated by ceiling collapse portals or require flashlights, available on loan.

Recent activity 
A series of small earthquakes in late 1988 has been attributed to subsidence in the caldera.  North-northeast trending ground cracks, as well as north-northeast trending vent series show relationships between tectonism and volcanism. One notable ground crack, the Big Crack, extends along the northeastern boundary of the monument.

Climate
The climate is characterized by warm, dry summers and cold, moderately snowy winters. The average window for freezing temperatures is September 23 thru June 7.

Flora and fauna

Flora 

The lava tube collapse systems and lava outcrops support a great diversity of plant life, from an impressive variety of lichens and mosses to plants such as desert sweet (Chamaebatiaria millefolium), the aromatic purple desert sage (Salvia dorrii carnosa) and yellow blazing star (Mentzelia laevicaulis).
An impressive variety of fern species are present in cave entrances including the spreading wood fern (Dryopteris expansa) and the western swordfern (Polystichum munitum).

Fauna
Despite harsh, semi-arid conditions, native wildlife has adapted to the environmental constraints present in the region. There are no terrestrial water resources in Lava Beds National Monument. Some animals obtain water from caves, while others fly about twenty km (12 miles) north to Tule Lake. Federal and state animal species of special concern in the Monument include the Cooper's hawk (Accipiter cooperii), fringed myotis (Myotis thysanodes), long-eared myotis (Myotis evotis), long-legged myotis (Myotis volans), pallid bat (Antrozous pallidus), silver-haired bat (Lasionycteris noctivigans), Townsends big-eared bat (Corynorhinus townsendii), western small-footed myotis (Myotis ciliolabrum), and American badger (Taxidea taxus).

Because of a lack of surface water, amphibian presence in the monument is limited. The most common species found in the monument is the Pacific tree frog (Pseudacris regilla). This species is also found in the biologically rich cave entrances in the monument. Reptile species found in the monument include the northern sagebrush lizard (Sceloporus graciosus graciosus), Great Basin fence lizard (Sceloporus occidentalis biseriatus), western skink (Eumeces skiltonianus skiltonianus), Rocky Mountain rubber boa (Charina bottae utahensis), gopher snake (Pituophis melanoleucus), desert night snake (Hypsiglena torquata deserticola), and western rattlesnake (Crotalus viridis).

Key animal species by habitat:
 Bunch grass-sagebrush grasslands: mule deer, gopher snake, coyote, prairie falcon, western meadowlark, Anderson's larkspur, yellow-bellied marmot, kangaroo rat
 Ponderosa-juniper brushlands: pronghorn, bobcat, scrub jay, jackrabbit, mountain bluebird,
 Pine forest: mountain lion, bald eagle (winter resident), golden-mantled ground squirrel
 Rocky lava flows: western fence lizard, western rattlesnake
 Cave mouths and interior passages: violet-green swallow, Brazilian free-tailed bat, Townsend's big-eared bat, Pacific tree frog, pika, bushy-tailed woodrat
 Lake shore areas: skunk, raccoon, great horned owl, short-eared owl.

History

Archeological site
Lava Beds National Monument includes Petroglyph Point, one of the largest panels of Native American rock art in the United States. The region was historically occupied by the Modoc people. The Lava Beds National Monument Archeological District was listed on the National Register of Historic Places in March 1991.

Modoc War

During the Modoc War of 1872–1873, warriors of a band led by Kintpuash (Captain Jack) used the lava beds as a defensive stronghold to resist being captured and returned to the Klamath Reservation in Oregon, to which they had been removed, as European Americans wanted their lands. The Modoc took refuge in a natural lava fortress that was later named Captain Jack's Stronghold. From this defensive base, a group of 53 fighting men and their families held off US Army forces, amounting to ten times the Modocs' population, for five months.

In April 1873, at a peace commission meeting, Captain Jack killed General Edward Canby while associates killed Reverend Eleazer Smith and wounded two other commissioners. Canby was the only casualty of the Indian Wars who had the rank of general at the time of his death. The Modoc mistakenly thought the Americans would leave if their leaders were killed. Instead Army reinforcements were brought in and the Modoc were eventually forced to surrender. Kintpuash and his associates were convicted of war crimes for the murders, and executed by hanging at Fort Klamath.

Lava Beds Wilderness

The Lava Beds National Wilderness is a  wilderness area within the Lava Beds National Monument.  It was designated by the US Congress on October 13, 1972, with passage of Public Law 92-493.
The wilderness protects more than half of the national monument in two separate eastern and western units. The larger eastern unit contains the extensive Schonchin lava flow on the east side of the monument. The western unit covers the monument's area within the transition zone of the Cascade Range's montane southern end and the arid Modoc Plateau ecosystems.

The different soil types creates plant community diversity in the wilderness area, providing various habitats for a wide range of wildlife. The numerous coyotes and foxes, as well as raptors, feed on rodents such as the jackrabbit and kangaroo rat. The kangaroo rat is especially adapted to waterless environments because it does not need to drink. It obtains water as a byproduct of the oxidation of nutrients in the seeds it eats.

Many raptors are seen in the wilderness area, with 24 species of hawks identified. The monument is located on the Pacific Flyway, and the bald eagle winters in the northern portion of the wilderness area.

The National Park Service manages the Lava Beds wilderness area and has several restrictions in place. Camping is prohibited near cave entrances or trails. Open campfires may be prohibited during very hot and dry weather.

Lava Beds trails 
The Lava Beds National Monument has 13 hiking trails, all of which cross or enter the backcountry. The most popular trails are short, but lead to a number of historic sites as to several geological areas within the Lava Beds Wilderness. The long trails are mostly in designated wilderness areas.

These trails are primarily associated with park attractions, especially the Lava Beds geological wilderness, and are sometimes out-and-back day hikes, and in many cases are improved boardwalks and supported with interpretive signs and exhibits.

Monument expansion
An administrative transfer brought two parcels of land which were previously managed by the Bureau of Reclamation and the Bureau of Land Management into National Park Service management. These two parcels adjoin the Petroglyph Point Unit of the monument.

See also
 List of national monuments of the United States
 Medicine Lake Volcano
 Volcanic Legacy Scenic Byway
 List of Klamath Basin birds

References

External links

  of the National Park Service (NPS)
 Park map (NPS)
 "The Life of Lava Beds" (NPS)

 
Modoc Plateau
National Park Service National Monuments in California
Parks in Siskiyou County, California
Protected areas of Modoc County, California
Volcanic fields of California
Lava fields
Lava tubes
Caves of California
Cinder cones of the United States
Volcanism of California
Volcanoes of Siskiyou County, California
Archaeological sites in California
Natural history of Modoc County, California
Natural history of Siskiyou County, California
Modoc Crater
Articles containing video clips
Protected areas established in 1925
1925 establishments in California